The 28 cm MRK L/35 was a German naval gun that was used in World War I as the primary armament of the Brandenburg-class pre-dreadnought battleships.  It also saw use as a Coastal-defense gun during World War II.

Design 
The 28 cm MRK L/35 gun was a built-up gun made from three layers of reinforcing hoops.  It used a cylindro-prismatic horizontal sliding breech, but unlike later Krupp guns it didn't use a metallic cartridge case.  Instead, it used separate loading bagged charges and projectiles.

The four ships of the Brandenburg-class had a slightly unusual arrangement for their primary armament. Although the primary armament consisted of six 28 cm guns in three twin gun turrets that all fired the same ammunition, the fore and aft turrets had 28 cm MRK L/40 guns, while the amidships turret had 28 cm MRK L/35 guns due to space constraints. The ships did not have centralized fire control and each gun type had different ballistics.

Coastal defense 
In addition to its role as a naval gun, the 28 cm MRK L/35 also saw use as a coastal defense gun.  In 1893 Norway bought three guns on shielded coastal mounts to equip the Oscarsborg Fortress, which guards the Oslofjord that leads to the Norwegian capital of Oslo.  

When Norway was invaded on 9 April 1940 the three guns of the Oscarsborg Fortress together with shore mounted torpedo launchers sank the German Heavy Cruiser Blücher during the Battle of Drøbak Sound.  This foiled a German naval landing which was attempting to capture Oslo and allowed the Norwegian royal family to escape.

In 1910 two ships of the Brandenburg-class were sold to the Ottoman Empire and two ships remained in the High Seas Fleet until they were deactivated during World War I and scrapped after the war.  When the two ships in German service were deactivated during World War I there were plans to convert the four guns to coastal mounts and deploy them to protect the Dardanelles.  However, the fortifications they were planned to arm were never finished and the guns remained unused.

Ammunition 

Photo gallery

References 

280 mm artillery
Naval guns of Germany
Coastal artillery